National Secondary Route 240, or just Route 240 (or ) is a National Road Route of Costa Rica, located in the Limón province.

Description
In Limón province the route covers Limón canton (Limón, Río Blanco districts).

References

Highways in Costa Rica